Kisha e Shën Kollit may refer to several monuments in Albania:

Kisha e Shën Kollit (Perondi), Berat
Kisha e Shën Kollit (Shelcan), Elbasan